Jaume Francesc Folc de Cardona i de Gandia (1405-1 December 1466) was a Catholic cardinal. He was bishop of Urgell, then in the Principality of Catalonia, and the 22nd president of the Generalitat de Catalunya between 1443 and 1446.

He was chosen as a cardinal by Pope Pius II on 18 December 1461.

Biography
Canon and Archedian in Barcelona, perpetual administrator of the abbey of Santa Maria de Solsona and ecclesiastical deputy of the Provincial Council of the General of Catalonia. In 1445 he was appointed Bishop of Vich. He was a pontifical endorsement of Pope Nicholas V. In 1549 he was transferred to the Diocese of Girona and in 1461 to Urgel.

Pope Pius II created him cardinal in the consistory of 18 December 1461. Cardona never went to Rome to receive the cardinal cape and did not participate in the conclave of 1464 (election of Paul II).

References

1405 births
1466 deaths
15th-century Princes of Andorra
Bishops of Urgell
15th-century Spanish cardinals
Presidents of the Government of Catalonia
15th-century Roman Catholic bishops in the Kingdom of Aragon